Racinaea domingosmartinis is a plant species in the genus Racinaea. This species is endemic to Brazil.

References

domingosmartinis
Flora of Brazil